The 2014 Sam Houston State Bearkats football team represented Sam Houston State University in the 2014 NCAA Division I FCS football season. The Bearkats were led by first-year head coach K. C. Keeler and played their home games at Bowers Stadium. They are a member of the Southland Conference. They finished the season 11–5, 7–1 in Southland play to finish in a share of the Southland Conference title. They received the Southland's automatic bid to the FCS Playoffs where they defeated Southeastern Louisiana, Jacksonville State, and Villanova to advance to the Semifinals where they lost to North Dakota State. But, along the way they lost to eventual D-2 Champion CSU-Pueblo.

Schedule

Source:

Game summaries

at Eastern Washington

Sources:

Alabama State

Sources:

at LSU

Sources:

CSU-Pueblo

Sources:

at Lamar

Sources:

McNeese State

Sources:

at Northwestern State

Sources:

Abilene Christian

Sources:

Stephen F Austin (Reliant Stadium)

Sources:

at Incarnate Word

Sources:

at Houston Baptist

Sources:

Central Arkansas

Sources:

FCS Playoffs

Southeastern Louisiana (FCS Playoffs First Round)

Sources:

at Jacksonville State (FCS Playoffs Second Round)

Sources:

at Villanova (FCS Playoffs Quarterfinals)

Sources:

at North Dakota St (FCS Playoffs Semifinal)

Sources:

Ranking movements

References

Sam Houston State
Sam Houston Bearkats football seasons
Southland Conference football champion seasons
Sam Houston State
Sam Houston State Bearkats football